The list of ship decommissionings in 2004 includes a chronological list of all ships decommissioned in 2004.

See also

2004
 Ship decommissionings
Ship